Gösta Danielson (17 November 1889 – 14 February 1960) was a Swedish athlete.  He competed in the 1908 Summer Olympics in London. In the 800 metres, Danielson did not finish his initial semifinal heat and did not advance to the final.

References

Sources
 
 
 

1889 births
1960 deaths
Athletes (track and field) at the 1908 Summer Olympics
Olympic athletes of Sweden
Swedish male middle-distance runners